The limbless fine-lined slider (Lerista ameles)  is a species of skink found in Queensland in Australia.

References

Lerista
Reptiles described in 1979
Taxa named by Allen Eddy Greer